The X Factor is a television music competition franchise created by British producer Simon Cowell and his company Syco Entertainment. It originated in the United Kingdom, where it was devised as a replacement for Pop Idol (2001–2003), and has been adapted in various countries. The "X Factor" of the title refers to the undefinable "something" that makes for star quality.

Similar to Got Talent, the franchise maintains a YouTube channel, called X Factor Global. The channel uploads clips of X Factor shows from around the world. The channel currently has over 3 million subscribers. Additionally, many individual X Factor shows have their own YouTube channels such as X Factor Latvia.

Format
The prize is usually a recording contract, in addition to the publicity that appearance in the later stages of the show itself generates, not only for the winner but also for other highly ranked contestants.

Unlike Idols, where the judges only critique the contestants' performances, on The X Factor each judge "mentors" the finalists in a particular category, aiding them with song selection and styling, while also participating together in judging the contestants in the other categories. Not only Idols, but also new singing shows such as The Voice, The Four and All Together Now have become rivals and popular in recent years.

The X Factor around the world

There have been a total of 234 winners of The X Factor worldwide.

 Franchise that is currently airing Franchise that is not currently airing, but is slated to return in the future Franchise that has ended Franchise that was cancelled during production Franchise whose status is unknown

Notes

  As a one-off judge replacing Prūsaitis
  Also shown in Republic of Ireland and in series 3, 4, 7 and 13 auditions were held in Dublin, and viewers in Ireland were allowed to vote. The UK version of The X Factor is also shown in Malta on channel TVM.

See also
 Popstars
 Idols (franchise)
 Star Academy
 Got Talent
 The Voice (franchise)
 List of reality television show franchises
 List of television show franchises

Notes

References

 
Television franchises
Television series by Fremantle (company)